Pangaio is a municipality in the Kavala regional unit, Greece, named after the Pangaion hills. The seat of the municipality is in Eleftheroupoli.

Municipality
The municipality Pangaio was formed at the 2011 local government reform by the merger of the following 5 former municipalities, that became municipal units:
Eleftheres
Eleftheroupoli
Orfano
Pangaio
Piereis

The municipality has an area of 701.427 km2, the municipal unit 79.634 km2.

Province
The province of Pangaio was one of the provinces of the Kavala Prefecture. It had the same territory as the present municipality, except a part of the municipal unit Eleftheroupoli. It was abolished in 2006.

See also
Forest villages (Greece)

References

Municipalities of Eastern Macedonia and Thrace
Provinces of Greece
Populated places in Kavala (regional unit)